The individual dressage at the 1956 Summer Olympics took place between 15 and 16 June, at the Stockholm Olympic Stadium. The event was open to men and women. The team and individual dressage competitions used the same results. Five judges gave scores, with the result being the sum of the scores.

Results

36 riders competed.

References

Equestrian at the 1956 Summer Olympics